Astoria (formerly "Vienna") is an incorporated town in Fulton County, Illinois, United States. The population was 1,141 at the 2010 census.

Geography
Astoria is located in southwestern Fulton County at  (40.227439, -90.357791). U.S. Route 24 passes through the center of town, leading northeast  to Lewistown, the county seat, and southwest  to Rushville.

Demographics

At the 2000 census there were 1,193 people, 501 households, and 328 families in the town. The racial makeup of the town was 98.74% White, 0.34% Asian, 0.42% from other races, and 0.50% from two or more races. Hispanic or Latino of any race were 1.17%.

Of the 501 households 30.9% had children under the age of 18 living with them, 52.5% were married couples living together, 8.0% had a female householder with no husband present, and 34.5% were non-families. 32.1% of households were one person and 20.0% were one person aged 65 or older.  The average household size was 2.30 and the average family size was 2.89.

The age distribution was 23.9% under the age of 18, 8.3% from 18 to 24, 24.9% from 25 to 44, 19.3% from 45 to 64, and 23.6% 65 or older.  The median age was 40 years. For every 100 females, there were 90.9 males.  For every 100 females age 18 and over, there were 84.6 males.

The median household income was $26,694 and the median family income  was $31,940. Males had a median income of $30,774 versus $19,479 for females. The per capita income for the town was $12,758.  About 9.2% of families and 11.3% of the population were below the poverty line, including 15.0% of those under age 18 and 10.3% of those age 65 or over.

Major Highways
  U.S. Route 24

References

External links
 History of Astoria Township

1839 establishments in Illinois
Populated places established in 1839
Towns in Fulton County, Illinois
Towns in Illinois